Marcio Ferreira de Souza or simply Marcio Ferreira (Santo André, October 3, 1977) is  a Brazilian football defender who is naturalized Italian. Who last played for Aris Limassol.

Honours
APOP Kinyras
 Cypriot Cup: 2008–09

References

1977 births
Living people
Brazilian footballers
Brazilian expatriate footballers
União Recreativa dos Trabalhadores players
Ipatinga Futebol Clube players
Sociedade Esportiva do Gama players
Mogi Mirim Esporte Clube players
Associação Atlética Caldense players
Club Atlético Colón footballers
APOP Kinyras FC players
Aris Limassol FC players
Cypriot First Division players
Expatriate footballers in Cyprus
Expatriate footballers in Argentina
Brazilian people of Italian descent
Association football defenders
People from Santo André, São Paulo
Footballers from São Paulo (state)